Felicioliva kaleontina is a species of sea snail, a marine gastropod mollusc in the family Olividae, a family of what are commonly called the olive snails.

Subspecies
 Felicioliva kaleontina chimu Petuch & Berschauer, 2017
 Felicioliva kaleontina kaleontina (Duclos, 1835)

Distribution
The snail is found in the Gulf of California, West Mexico and North Peru.

References

 Petuch E.J. & Berschauer D.P. (2017). A new genus and a new subspecies of olive shell (Olividae: Olivinae) from the eastern Pacific Ocean. The Festivus. 49(3): 224-228

External links

 Duclos, P. L. (1835-1840). Histoire naturelle générale et particulière de tous les genres de coquilles univalves marines a l'état vivant et fossile publiée par monographie. Genre Olive. Paris: Institut de France. 33 plates: pls 1-12 [1835], pls 13-33

Olividae
Gastropods described in 1835